Tshering Choden or Tshering Chhoden may refer to:

 Tshering Choden (archer) (born 1979), Bhutanese archer
 Tshering Choden (politician) (born c. 1973), Bhutanese politician